Jani Elelbawi  is a Syrian village located in Uqayribat Subdistrict in Salamiyah District, Hama.  According to the Syria Central Bureau of Statistics (CBS), Jani Elelbawi had a population of 835 in the 2004 census. Jani Elelbawi was captured by Syrian Army on 22 August 2017.

References 

Populated places in Salamiyah District